The Raiders are an ice hockey team based in Romford, participating in the National Division of the National Ice Hockey League (NIHL), the second tier of British ice hockey.

They were known as the Romford Raiders when they were based at the Romford Ice Arena in the London Borough of Havering.  They were founder members of the English Premier Ice Hockey League but have competed in the NIHL since 2012. Their development team was the Romford Spitfires, which played in Division 2 of the NIHL before being succeeded in 2009/10 by the Romford Fury.

The team moved to Leyton, East London, in 2013, when it adopted the new name London Raiders. Its team colours are white, gold and blue, and fans of the team are known as the Gold and Blue Army.  The team returned to Romford in 2018, keeping the London Raiders name.

History

The club was founded in 1987 under the name Romford Raiders and coached by Gord Jeffrey, who went on to become a hero amongst the Romford fans.

Some of the best-known players to play for the Raiders include Rob Stewart, Dave Whistle and Mike Ellis, all of whom went on to play and coach at the highest levels in the UK.

The Raiders' first ever match was played on Sunday 13 September 1987, against the Oxford City Stars. Romford's first captain, Erskine Douglas, also scored the Raiders' first ever goal.

On 28 November 2010, during an English National League game against the Bracknell Hornets, Danny Marshall scored his 1,232nd point as a Raider when he assisted on a short-handed goal by Frankie Harvey. With that point, Marshall became the club's all-time leading scorer, surpassing Gord Jeffrey's long-standing record.

In 2013, the Romford Ice Arena was sold by Havering Council to investors. The team subsequently had to move to Lee Valley Ice Centre and became the London Raiders.

On February 3, 2018, the Raiders' played their first game at their new home back in Romford, the Sapphire Ice and Leisure Centre. London would come back to win 5–2 against the Cardiff Fire in front of a sell-out crowd. Former Romford Junior Olegs Lascenko scored the team's first ever goal at the new venue, however, it was Cardiff's Jackson Price who scored the first goal overall.

Season Records

The following list details the Raiders' finishes in the league, and notes any playoff success.

League

Cups

Club roster 2022-23
(*) Denotes a Non-British Trained player (Import)

2021/22 Outgoing

External links
 London Raiders Official Site
 London Raiders statistics at eurohockey.com
 London Raiders statistics at Elite Prospects
 Romford Raiders page at Hockey DB

References

Sport in the London Borough of Havering
Ice hockey teams in London
Romford
Viking Age in popular culture